Henri Jacques Daniel Paul François (16 May 1920 – 25 November 2003), known as Jacques François was a French actor. During a sixty-year career (1942–2002) he appeared in more than 120 films and over 30 stage productions. In 1948 he went to Hollywood with a view to playing the lead in Letter from an Unknown Woman (Max Ophüls, 1948) but the part went to Louis Jourdan. After appearing alongside Fred Astaire and Ginger Rogers as the playwright Jacques Pierre Barredout in The Barkleys of Broadway (1949) he returned to France.

François regularly dubbed Gregory Peck into French.

During World War II, he served as a captain in the French First Army under General de Lattre.

Filmography

References

External links
 

1920 births
2003 deaths
Male actors from Paris
French male film actors
French male stage actors
French National Academy of Dramatic Arts alumni
20th-century French male actors